Robert Ellsberg (born 1955) is an American media personality known as the editor-in-chief and publisher of Orbis Books, the publishing arm of Maryknoll.

Early life
Robert is the son of Carol Cummings and the American military analyst and whistleblower Daniel Ellsberg. He is the older brother of epidemiologist Mary Ellsberg and author Michael Ellsberg.  In 1975, at age 19, he dropped out of college, intending to spend a few months with the Catholic Worker Movement.

Career
He stayed to become the managing editor of The Catholic Worker for two years (1976–78), a job that would introduce him to Dorothy Day and consequently would allow him to work with Day for the last five years of her life.

Ellsberg returned to Harvard, and earned a degree in religion and literature, and later a Master's in Theology from Harvard Divinity School.

In 1984 his book By Little and By Little won a Christopher Award.

In 1987 he began work as editor-in-chief of Orbis Books. He is the author of several books, many of which have received awards; his Blessed Among All Women tied a Catholic Press Association record by winning awards for Gender, Spirituality, and Popular Presentation of the Catholic Faith. He is the editor of the published diaries and letters of Dorothy Day.

Books
Gandhi on Christianity (1991)
All Saints: Daily Reflections on Saints, Prophets, and Witnesses for Our Time (Crossroad, 1997)
The Saints' Guide to Happiness: Practical Lessons in the Life of the Spirit, Doubleday, 2005. 
Blessed Among All Women: Reflections on Women Saints, Prophets, and Witnesses for Our Time (Crossroad, 2006).
The Duty Of Delight: The Diaries of Dorothy Day.  (editor) Marquette University Press, Milwaukee, 2008All the Way to Heaven: The Selected Letters of Dorothy Day.  (editor) Marquette University Press, Milwaukee, 2010.
Blessed Among Us: Day by Day with Saintly Witnesses. ISBN 9780814647219  (Liturgical Press, 2016)

References 

Catholic Workers
Place of birth missing (living people)
Jewish American writers
1955 births
Living people
Harvard Divinity School alumni
21st-century American Jews